Huddersfield Town's 1950–51 campaign continued Town's post-war form of narrowly surviving relegation to Division Two. They finished in 19th place, just four points clear of the three teams below them, Chelsea, who survived relegation and the unlucky twosome of Sheffield Wednesday and Everton.

Squad at the start of the season

Review
Since the end of World War II, Town's form was more relegation than championship-winning form. However, Town's form at the start of the season was impressive with 5 wins in their first 7 games. Following that, Town's form made a rapid spiral downwards with a dreadful 6–2 loss against Arsenal and an even worse 8–0 defeat by Middlesbrough. Town's form would eventually improve following the defensive purchases of Bill McGarry and Laurie Kelly. Between December and mid-March, Town would only win 2 matches, oddly enough both away from home at Burnley and Aston Villa.

Town were in dire straits by the end of the season, but an amazing run of form saw Town record impressive wins over wouldbe champions Tottenham Hotspur and 3rd placed Blackpool. A 6–0 defeat by Manchester United right at the end made no difference to Town's fate, with the Terriers just surviving yet again. They finished in 19th place, just 4 points clear of the 3 teams below them, Chelsea, who survived relegation and the unlucky twosome of Sheffield Wednesday and Everton.

Squad at the end of the season

Results

Division One

FA Cup

Appearances and goals

1950-51
English football clubs 1950–51 season